In the mathematical subject geometric group theory, a fully irreducible automorphism of the free group Fn is an element of Out(Fn) which has no  periodic conjugacy classes of proper free factors in Fn (where n > 1). Fully irreducible automorphisms are also referred to as "irreducible with irreducible powers" or "iwip" automorphisms. The notion of being fully irreducible provides a key Out(Fn) counterpart of the notion of a pseudo-Anosov element of the mapping class group of a finite type surface. Fully irreducibles play an important role in the study of structural properties of individual elements  and of subgroups of Out(Fn).

Formal definition

Let  where .
Here saying that   is a proper free factor of  means that  and there exists a subgroup  such that .

Two fully irreducibles  are called independent if .

Relationship to irreducible automorphisms

The notion of being fully irreducible grew out of an older notion of an ``irreducible" outer automorphism of  originally introduced in. An element , where , is called irreducible if there does not exist a free product decomposition

Then  is fully irreducible in the sense of the definition above  if and only if for every   is irreducible.

It is known that for any atoroidal  (that is, without periodic conjugacy classes of nontrivial elements of ), being irreducible is equivalent to being fully irreducible.

Properties

 If  and  then  is fully irreducible if and only if  is fully irreducible.
Every fully irreducible  can be represented by an expanding irreducible train track map.
Every fully irreducible  has exponential growth in  given by a stretch factor .
 
Unlike for stretch factors of pseudo-Anosov surface homeomorphisms, it can happen that for a fully irreducible  one has  and this behavior is believed to be generic. However, Handel and Mosher proved that for every  there exists a finite constant  such that for every fully irreducible 
 
A fully irreducible element  acts on the space of projectivized geodesic currents  with either ``North-South" or ``generalized North-South" dynamics, depending on whether  is atoroidal or non-atoroidal.
 If  is fully irreducible, then the commensurator  is virtually cyclic.
If  is an arbitrary subgroup, then either  contains a fully irreducible element, or there exist a finite index subgroup  and a proper free factor  of  such that .
 An element  acts as a loxodromic isometry on the free factor complex  if and only if  is fully irreducible.
More precisely, if  is a measure on  whose support generates a semigroup in   containing some two independent fully irreducibles.
A related object, defined for an atoroidal fully irreducible , is the axis bundle , which is a certain -invariant closed subset proper homotopy equivalent to a line.

References

Further reading
Thierry Coulbois and Arnaud Hilion, Botany of irreducible automorphisms of free groups, Pacific Journal of Mathematics 256 (2012), 291–307.
Karen Vogtmann, On the geometry of outer space. Bulletin of the American Mathematical Society 52 (2015), no. 1, 27–46.

Geometric group theory
Geometric topology